The 2019 FIM Cross-Country Rallies World Championship was the 17th season of the FIM Cross-Country Rallies World Championship, an international rally raid competition for motorbikes and quads.

Calendar
The calendar for the 2019 season featured four long-distance rally raid events; including one marathon event in the Silk Way Rally.   Some of the events were also part of 2019 FIA World Cup for Cross-Country Rallies.

Teams and riders

Results

Motorbikes

Quads

Championship standings

Riders' championship
 Points for final positions were awarded as follows:

In Marathon Rallies (i.e. rallies with between eight and fifteen timed stages, including a rest day), the score was multiplied by 1.5 and rounded up. 

Furthermore, all riders were awarded 3 bonus points for taking part in the first stage of an event; 1 bonus point for all riders taking the start of a stage (other than the first one) of a Marathon Rally; as well as 1 bonus point for each stage win.  No rider was required to be classified in order to score these bonus points. 

Points for manufacturers were awarded by added the top two finishers of the respective manufacturer together from each event.

Motorbikes World Championship: Riders and Manufacturers

Quads World Cup: Riders

References

External links
 

FIM Cross-Country Rallies World Championship
Cross-Country Rallies World Championship
Cross-Country Rallies
Cross-Country Rallies
Cross-country